Vera Zvonareva was the defending champion, but had to withdraw before the tournament began due to a right wrist injury.

Anna Chakvetadze won the title, defeating Akiko Morigami 6–1, 6–3 in the final.

Seeds

Draw

Finals

Top half

Bottom half

References

External links 
 Main and Qualifying draw

Singles